WFSH-FM (104.7 MHz) is a radio station licensed to Athens, Georgia, and serving Metro Atlanta.  The station is owned by Salem Media Group and it airs a Christian contemporary radio format.  It is branded as The Fish 104.7 and describes itself as "Safe For The Whole Family."  Between Thanksgiving and the weekend after Christmas, the station plays all Christmas music, both religious and secular.

WFSH-FM has its offices and radio studios in the Buckhead district of Atlanta. The height above average terrain (HAAT) of this tower allows the station to better penetrate office buildings in Atlanta. The effective radiated power (ERP) is 24,000 watts.

Programming
WFSH-FM is one of three Christian Contemporary stations serving Metro Atlanta, along with 106.7 WAKL and 93.3 WVFJ-FM.  Unlike its competitors, which are run by non-profit organizations and seek donations, WFSH-FM is a commercial radio station.  Salem uses "The Fish" as the moniker for several of its Christian Contemporary stations, including KFSH Los Angeles, WFHM-FM Cleveland and WFFH Nashville. The fish, called the Ichthys, was used as a symbol of the early Christian Church.

History
In January 1964, the station signed on as WDOL-FM.  It was the FM counterpart of AM 1470 WDOL (now WXAG).  Both stations were owned by James S. Rivers, who served as the president.  Because WDOL was a daytimer,  WDOL-FM simulcasted the AM station's country music format during the day and continued on its own after sunset when WDOL had to be off the air.  WDOL-FM was powered at only 3,500 watts, limiting its signal to Athens and adjacent communities, not hitting the larger Atlanta radio market..

In the 1970s, the station got a boost to 50,000 watts.  As more people acquired FM radios, WDOL-FM switched its call sign to WJSR and aired a progressive rock format, while co-owned WDOL continued as a country outlet.

In 1976, WJSR was acquired by Broadcast Properties, Inc.  The station flipped to Top 40/CHR, as WAGQ, and became an affiliate of the ABC Contemporary Network. Even though the station had a 50,000 watt signal on a 230 foot tower, it was still limited to serving Athens and its surrounding towns.

In the mid-1980s, WAGQ asked the Federal Communications Commission (FCC) for a construction permit to double its power to 100,000 watts and greatly increase its antenna height to over 1,000 feet, using to a tower closer to Atlanta.  This would make WAGQ a "move-in station," serving the more lucrative Atlanta market.  The FCC granted the request, making WAGQ a Class C1 station.

In 1989, the station was sold to Ring Radio, Inc., which also owned WCNN.  "Music Radio 104.7" debuted, with a hot adult contemporary format.  The station switched its call sign to WALR in July 1990.

On October 8, 1990, WALR-FM was relaunched with an urban adult contemporary format as "Love 104.7", then later on as "Kiss 104.7".  This was the second incarnation of the "Kiss" branding, after it was previously used in the mid-1980s on WEKS (the former call sign on 104.1).  Under this format, it was the first permanent competitor to attempt to chip away at the African-American audience enjoyed by heritage urban station WVEE.

On August 30, 2000, WALR and its adult urban format moved to 104.1, now known as "Kiss 104.1," to make room for Christian Contemporary "104.7 the Fish."  The swap was part of an asset exchange between Cox Media Group and Salem Communications.

WFSH-FM hosts "Celebrate Freedom Atlanta" each year on Labor Day weekend.  The free outdoor concert features 15 to 20 artists and takes place at Jim R. Miller Park in Marietta, Georgia.  The concert had an attendance of 42,000 its first year in 2007.

Personalities
WFSH-FM is unusual in having all weekday air shifts hosted by women DJs.  The morning show is co-hosted by a man and a woman.

Kevin & Taylor mornings (since WFSH-FM's debut)
Parks Stamper middays (since WFSH-FM's debut)
Beth Bacall afternoons
Penny Faulkner evenings
Uncle Buck, Margaret Cheeley, Kim Fitz, Mark Harp and Curt Zehner weekends

Awards
2002 Gospel Music Association "Station of the Year"
2002, 2003 and 2005 Georgia Association of Broadcasters "Station of the Year"
Kevin and Taylor in the Morning, 2003 and 2004 Radio and Records "Personalities of the Year"
Kevin and Taylor in the Morning, 2006 and 2007 Atlanta Journal-Constitution "Best Morning Drive Show"

Gallery
Celebrate Freedom concert on September 1, 2007.

See also
List of radio stations in Georgia (U.S. state)

References

External links

Contemporary Christian radio stations in the United States
FSH-FM
Radio stations established in 1964
1964 establishments in Georgia (U.S. state)
Salem Media Group properties
FSH-FM